The following Confederate States Army units and commanders fought in the Second Battle of Bull Run, called the Second Battle of Manassas by Confederate records, of the American Civil War. The Union order of battle is listed separately. Order of battle compiled from the army organization during the battle, the casualty returns and the reports.

Abbreviations used

Military rank
 Gen = General
 MG = Major General
 BG = Brigadier General
 Col = Colonel
 Ltc = Lieutenant Colonel
 Maj = Major
 Cpt = Captain
 Lt = Lieutenant

Other
 (w) = wounded
 (mw) = mortally wounded
 (k) = killed in action
 (c) = captured

Army of Northern Virginia

Gen Robert E. Lee, Commanding

Right Wing
MG James Longstreet

Left Wing
MG Thomas J. Jackson

Chief of Artillery: Col Stapleton Crutchfield

Cavalry

Notes

References
 Robert Underwood Johnson, Clarence Clough Buell, Battles and Leaders of the Civil War, Volume 2 (Pdf), New York: The Century Co., 1887.
 Hennessy, John J., Return to Bull Run: The Campaign and Battle of Second Manassas. University of Oklahoma Press, Norman, 1993. 
 Manassas National Battlefield Park - Battle of Second Manassas
 Sibley, Jr., F. Ray, The Confederate Order of Battle, Volume 1, The Army of Northern Virginia, Shippensburg, Pennsylvania, 1996. 
 U.S. War Department, The War of the Rebellion: a Compilation of the Official Records of the Union and Confederate Armies, U.S. Government Printing Office, 1880–1901.

American Civil War orders of battle